U.S. Route 280 (US 280) is a spur of U.S. Highway 80. It currently runs for 392 miles (631 km) from Blitchton, Georgia, at US 80 to Birmingham, Alabama at I-20/I-59. For much of its route, US 280 travels through rural areas and smaller cities in southern Georgia and east central Alabama.  Once the highway approaches Birmingham, it is a major suburban route. Numerous shopping centers are located on US 280 throughout northern Shelby County and southern Jefferson County.

US 280 is the main connector between Birmingham, AL and Auburn, AL.

Through Talladega County, Alabama, US 280 is known as the Jim Nabors Highway, in honor of the Sylacauga, Alabama, native known for portraying the television character Gomer Pyle.  The historical designation of US-280 and Alabama SR 38 is the Florida Short Route.

For many years, US 280 and SR 38 was considered one of the more dangerous routes in Alabama, due to the number of large stretches of narrow two-lane roadway leading southeastwardly from Birmingham. Work was completed in 2006 making US 280 a four-lane highway throughout the entire state of Alabama. This project began in the 1970s. As a result, US 280 now bypasses numerous small towns in east Alabama, including Goodwater, Jackson's Gap, Camp Hill and Waverly.

In Georgia, US 280 from Columbus to I-16 is also a Governor's Road Improvement Program (GRIP) corridor known as "Power Alley".

Route description

Alabama
US 280 terminates concurrently with U.S. 31 at I-20/I-59. US 31 continues onward at this point. The route continues through downtown Birmingham with US 31. They junction with US 11 and US 78 and climb over Red Mountain into Mtn. Brook as a section of highway called the Red Mountain Expressway. Here, US 280 splits off of US 31 at a highly complex interchange with elements of a Directional-T and a Parclo.

It continues on somewhat of a freeway through Mtn. Brook, eventually reaching The Summit, a huge outdoor mall. It also junctions with I-459 at this point, at a Parclo-like interchange which is being modified to better suit traffic.

The route continues through one of the more developed areas of east Birmingham and eventually climbs over Double Oak Mountain into Shelby County and Chelsea. It continues east to Harpersville, which is home to its junction with US 231 north and SR 25. US 280 continues with US 231 until it reaches the Coosa River, which it crosses into Talladega County. It eventually reaches Sylacauga, which is home to its junction with US 231 south and SR 21. This specific junction is a diamond interchange, commonly used on freeways.

The route continues south-east through northern Coosa County until it has another diamond interchange with SR 9. It then passes through Kellyton, which is home to its minor junction with SR 115.

It crosses into Tallapoosa County just before entering Alexander City, which is home to Russell Athletic. US 280 junctions with SR 22 and SR 63 in the city. It then proceeds through slightly hilly terrain to Dadeville. It junctions with SR 49, which connects the route to the Talladega National Forest/Cheaha State Park. It leaves Dadeville, promptly enters Camp Hill, junctions with SR 50, and enters the southwestern corner of Chambers County, and then crosses into Lee County.

The route then reaches The Bottle, which is named for the bright orange wooden replica of a Nehi soda bottle which stood in the location from 1924 to 1936.  It crosses into Auburn, which is barely skimmed by US 280 as it then crosses into nearby Opelika. The route junctions with US 29/I-85. It joins the freeway with them and continues through I-85's junction with SR 51. It then splits off of the road with US 431. It continues on a heavily traveled road into Russell County, and eventually to Phenix City, which is actually in the Eastern Time Zone due to its close proximity with Columbus, Georgia across the Chattahoochee River. It junctions with US 80. The route then leaves US 431 behind and crosses the Chattahoochee River, leaving Alabama and entering Georgia in Columbus.

US 280 has the unsigned designation of State Route 38 (SR 38) throughout its length in Alabama.

Georgia

US 280 begins in Georgia at the state's border with Alabama in Columbus. There it is paired with State Route 520 and U.S. Route 27. It maintains this designation as it passes through Fort Benning. Upon arriving in Cusseta, US 280/GA 520 diverge from US 27 and continue southeast to Richland, where US 280 splits off from GA 520. From here, US 280 continues on its own east, passing through Plains (the boyhood home of Jimmy Carter) and becomes cosigned with State Route 30 in Americus. US 280/SR 30 then continue east-southeast, crossing I-75 in Cordele, still continuing east through mainly rural areas of the southern portion of the state, passing through smaller towns such as McRae–Helena, Mount Vernon, Vidalia, and Pembroke. The highway then turns to the northeast as it leaves Pembroke, crossing I-16 at exit 143. Still continuing northeast, the highway then terminates in Blichton at U.S. Route 80.

National Highway System
Except for the easternmost portion between I-16 and the eastern terminus, the entire length of US 280 is part of the National Highway System, a system of routes determined to be the most important for the nation's economy, mobility, and defense.

History
Prior to the completion of the Elton B. Stephens Expressway in Birmingham, US 31, US 78, and US 280 traveled concurrently until they intersected US 11 at the intersection of 1st Avenue North and 24th Street.

Major intersections

See also

References

External links

Endpoints of U.S. Highway 280

80-2
80-2
80-2
2
Transportation in Jefferson County, Alabama
Transportation in Shelby County, Alabama
Transportation in Talladega County, Alabama
Transportation in Coosa County, Alabama
Transportation in Tallapoosa County, Alabama
Transportation in Chambers County, Alabama
Transportation in Lee County, Alabama
Transportation in Russell County, Alabama
Transportation in Muscogee County, Georgia
Transportation in Stewart County, Georgia
Transportation in Webster County, Georgia
Transportation in Sumter County, Georgia
Transportation in Crisp County, Georgia
Transportation in Wilcox County, Georgia
Transportation in Dodge County, Georgia
Transportation in Telfair County, Georgia
Transportation in Wheeler County, Georgia
Transportation in Montgomery County, Georgia
Transportation in Toombs County, Georgia
Transportation in Tattnall County, Georgia
Transportation in Evans County, Georgia
Transportation in Bryan County, Georgia